Saint-Barthélemy-de-Bussière (literally Saint-Barthélemy of Bussière) is a commune in the Dordogne department in Nouvelle-Aquitaine in southwestern France.

Population

Sights
 Jardin botanique des oiseaux, a botanical garden

See also
Communes of the Dordogne department

References

Communes of Dordogne